Ménil-Lépinois is a commune in the Ardennes department in northern France.

Population

See also
Communes of the Ardennes department

References

Communes of Ardennes (department)
Ardennes communes articles needing translation from French Wikipedia